Distorsio clathrata, common name the Atlantic distorsio, is a species of medium-sized sea snail, a marine gastropod mollusk in the family Personidae, the Distortio snails.

Distribution
This marine species occurs in the Caribbean Sea, the Gulf of Mexico and off the Lesser Antilles; in the Atlantic Ocean from North Carolina to Northeast Brasil.

Description 
The maximum recorded shell length is 79 mm.

Habitat 
Minimum recorded depth is 0 m. Maximum recorded depth is 300 m.

References

 Rosenberg, G.; Moretzsohn, F.; García, E. F. (2009). Gastropoda (Mollusca) of the Gulf of Mexico, Pp. 579–699 in: Felder, D.L. and D.K. Camp (eds.), Gulf of Mexico–Origins, Waters, and Biota. Texas A&M Press, College Station, Texas.

External links
 

Personidae
Taxa named by Jean-Baptiste Lamarck
Gastropods described in 1816